Critter Country is one of the "themed lands" at Disneyland Park and Tokyo Disneyland run by The Walt Disney Company and The Oriental Land Company. It was originally designed as Bear Country at Disneyland Park in 1972, with the Country Bear Jamboree as its centerpiece. It was later renamed Critter Country when Splash Mountain opened in 1989.

Disneyland

History
Critter Country was originally named Indian Village. From 1956–1971, this section of Frontierland was a showcase of Native American culture, including the arts and architecture of several regions, a multi tribal dance show, and the Indian War Canoes. The area was rebuilt as Disneyland's seventh themed land, Bear Country, which opened on March 4, 1972. 
The new four-acre land, Disneyland's first major expansion since the 1969 opening of The Haunted Mansion, cost $8 million to build. 
Located in the northwest quadrant of the park, Bear Country was themed to the forests of the Pacific Northwest. Country Bear Jamboree, which opened three weeks later, was the new land's centerpiece attraction.

Bear Country was also home to the Golden Bear Lodge, an eatery which was renamed Hungry Bear Restaurant in 1977, the Mile Long Bar refreshment center, Teddi Barra's Swingin' Arcade, and Davy Crockett's Explorer Canoes.

Bear Country was renamed Critter Country in 1988 in anticipation of Splash Mountain's January 1989 opening. 
Critter Country was inspired by a quote from the 1946 film Song of the South: "Where the folks are closer to the critters and the critters are closer to the folks." The land maintained some of its bear themes while incorporating other critters with their huts, nests, and burrows scattered throughout. Some of the land's shops were renamed to de-emphasize the bear presence; for example, Ursus H. Bear's Wilderness Outpost became Crocodile Mercantile (which itself became Pooh Corner in 1996). The Country Bear Jamboree closed in 2001 and was replaced two years later by The Many Adventures of Winnie the Pooh.

On roofs of buildings, such as the Briar Patch Store, there are small-scale critter houses of Winnie the Pooh and Piglet. Various types of trees have been planted to create a forestry atmosphere. Critter Country is somewhat small when compared to Disneyland's larger lands. This westernmost area features a single pathway that wraps around the footprint of Splash Mountain, starting near the Haunted Mansion and terminating in a series of shops nestled against the Splash Mountain show building.

In October 2016, the area closed temporarily. Critter Country reopened on November 4, 2016.

In June 2020, Disney announced that they will be reworking Splash Mountain to a new ride which was later revealed to be titled Tiana's Bayou Adventure, based on the 2009 animated film The Princess and the Frog. Disney stated that the project had been in discussion since 2019 and is being overseen by Walt Disney Imagineer Senior Creative Producer Charita Carter with Splash Mountain's original creator Tony Baxter serving as a creative adviser.

Attractions and entertainment
 Davy Crockett Explorer Canoes (1956-present) 
 The Many Adventures of Winnie the Pooh (2003-present) 
 Splash Mountain (1989-present)

Upcoming attractions and entertainment 
Tiana's Bayou Adventure (Opening in 2024)

Former attractions and entertainment
 Country Bear Playhouse (1972–2001)
 Teddi Barra's Swingin' Arcade (1972–2003)

Restaurants and refreshments
 Hungry Bear Restaurant
 Critter Country Fruit Cart
 Harbour Galley
 The Snackin' Place

Former restaurants
 Golden Bear Lodge (1972–1977)
 Mile Long Bar (1972–1989)
 Brer Bar (1989–2003)

Shops
 Pooh Corner
 The Briar Patch

Former shops
 Indian Trading Post (1962–1988)
 Ursus H. Bear's Wilderness Outpost (1972–1988)
 Crocodile Mercantile (1988–2003)
 Critter Country Plush (1996–2003)
 Professor Barnaby Owl’s Photographic Art Studio (1992–2020)

Tokyo Disneyland

When Splash Mountain opened at Tokyo Disneyland, Critter Country was specifically created for it. The only other attraction in this area is Beaver Brothers Explorer Canoes (formerly Davy Crockett's Explorer Canoes in Westernland). Because of the land's small size and the popularity of Splash Mountain, Critter Country is extremely crowded throughout the day. The Country Bear Jamboree is located in Westernland. Characters from backstory material written for the American versions of Splash Mountain to explain how Chickapin Hill came to be flooded are visualized within Tokyo's Critter Country, with the Beaver Brothers having built a dam that was destroyed by an exploding moonshine still owned by saloon owner Rackety Raccoon.

Attractions and entertainment
 Splash Mountain (1992-present)
 Beaver Brothers Explorer Canoes (1983-present)

Restaurants and refreshments
 Grandma Sara's Kitchen
 Rackety's Raccoon Saloon

Shops
 Hoot & Holler Hideout
 Splashdown Photos
 Critter Country Plush

See also

References

 
Themed areas in Walt Disney Parks and Resorts
Disneyland
Tokyo Disneyland
1988 establishments in California
1992 establishments in Japan